This is a list of the National Register of Historic Places listings in Cheboygan County, Michigan.

This is intended to be a complete list of the properties and districts on the National Register of Historic Places in Cheboygan County, Michigan, United States. Latitude and longitude coordinates are provided for many National Register properties and districts; these locations may be seen together in a map.

There are 10 properties and districts listed on the National Register in the county.



|}

See also

List of Michigan State Historic Sites in Cheboygan County, Michigan
 National Register of Historic Places listings in Michigan
 Listings in neighboring counties: Charlevoix, Emmet, Mackinac, Otsego, Presque Isle

References

Cheboygan County
Cheboygan County, Michigan
Buildings and structures in Cheboygan County, Michigan